The Korea International Trade Association (KITA) (Korean: 한국무역협회, Hanja: 韓國貿易協會) is a private non-profit trade organization founded in 1946 with 105 traders as its founding members. It is one of Korea's largest umbrella economic organizations and has more than 70,000 member firms, representing almost the entirety of Korea's international trade community.

KITA’s activities include support for overseas marketing and investment, promotion of international cooperation, provision of trade information and research, training of international trade specialists, and trade related consulting (including arbitration of trade disputes and policy recommendations for the government).

KITA runs the World Trade Center Seoul (WTCS), commonly known as COEX, which includes two large office complexes, the Trade Tower and ASEM Tower. The WTCS has a number of subsidiaries and affiliates, including the COEX Convention & Exhibition Center and COEX Mall. KITA owns KTNET (Korea Trade Network) which is the National Paperless Trade Platform or Single Window (uTradeHub) operator and e-commerce infrastructure (such as Certificate of Authority issuing Digital Certificate) related service provider.

In May 2012, KITA announced major renovation plans for the COEX Mall. It will spend  to the upgrade project. The renovation is needed to create passenger walkways between the new COEX Station on Seoul Subway Line 9, due for completion in 2014, with Samseong Station on Line 2. It is scheduled to start at the end of 2012 and for completed by November 2014. The floor space is expected to increased to 173,025 square meters from its current 152,116 square meters.

Main activities
 Trade Policy Recommendation & Trade Consulting
 Overseas Market & Trade Information Service
 Trade Diplomacy & Private Sector Cooperation 
 Specialist Training Programs & Research
 Buyer-Seller Business Matching

History
Since 2000
 2016 Jan.     Chengdu Center Established
 2015 Jan.     Jakarta Center Established
 2014 Jun.     Kmall24 service opened
 2014 Jan.     New Delhi Center Established
 2011 Sep.    Ho Chi Minh Center Established
 2011 Apr.     Jeju Center Established
 2010 Nov.     Hosted G20 Seoul Summit
 2009 Apr.     COEX Artium established
 2008 Apr.     tradeKorea service opened
 2006 Jul.      Announced “The New KITA Strategy” for KITA’s 60th anniversary
 2006 Feb.     Singapore Center established
 2006 Feb.     Washington Center established
 2005 Feb.     Korea Paperless Trade Center established
 2005 Feb.     Korea International Logistics Council established
 2002 Jun.     Shanghai Center established
 2000 Oct.     Hosted the 3rd Asia-Europe Meeting (ASEM)
 2000 May.    Extension of World Trade Center Seoul completed
From 1946 to 1999
 1995 Oct.     Gwangju Trade Tower opened
 1995 Apr.     Gyeongnam Trade Tower opened
 1992 Aug.    Beijing Center established
 1991 Dec.     KTNet established
 1988 Sep.     Construction of WTC Seoul completed
 1986 Jun.     Busan Trade Tower established
 1984 May.    Brussels Center established
 1984 Feb.     World Trade Academy opened
 1978 Aug.    COEX established
 1974 Aug.    New York Hankook Center (U.S.A) Inc. founded
 1972 Jan.     Joined WTCA (World Trade Center Association)
 1967 Jan.     New York Center established
 1948 Apr.     Tokyo Center established
 1946 Jul.      KITA founded

References

External links
 Korea International Trade Association (Official Website)
 Kmall24 
 tradeKorea

World Trade Center Seoul
Non-profit organizations based in South Korea
Organizations established in 1946
1946 establishments in Korea